Early numeracy is a branch of numeracy that aims to enhance numeracy learning for younger learners, particularly those at-risk in the area of mathematics. Usually the mathematical learning begins with simply learning the first digits, 1 through 10. This is done because it acts as an entry way to the expansion of counting. One can keep track of the digits using any of the phalanges

See also 

 Primary education

References 

Mathematics education